Sanaka Buchhikotaiah (3 August 1919 – 1 November 1986) was an Indian politician who served as the Member of Parliament in 1st Lok Sabha from Machilipatnam (Lok Sabha Constituency).

He joined the Communist Party of India in 1940. He was underground, and later detained 1948-1951. He was released in July 1951.

References

1919 births
1986 deaths
India MPs 1952–1957
Communist Party of India politicians from Andhra Pradesh
Lok Sabha members from Andhra Pradesh
People from Krishna district
Telugu politicians
Prisoners and detainees of British India